The F-1, commonly known as Rocketdyne F1, was a rocket engine developed by Rocketdyne. This engine uses a gas-generator cycle developed in the United States in the late 1950s and was used in the Saturn V rocket in the 1960s and early 1970s.  Five F-1 engines were used in the S-IC first stage of each Saturn V, which served as the main launch vehicle of the Apollo program. The F-1 remains the most powerful single combustion chamber liquid-propellant rocket engine ever developed.

History 

Rocketdyne developed the F-1 and the E-1 to meet a 1955 U.S. Air Force requirement for a very large rocket engine. The E-1, although successfully tested in static firing, was quickly seen as a technological dead-end, and was abandoned for the larger, more powerful F-1. The Air Force eventually halted development of the F-1 because of a lack of requirement for such a large engine. However, the recently created National Aeronautics and Space Administration (NASA) appreciated the usefulness of an engine with so much power and contracted Rocketdyne to complete its development. Test firings of F-1 components had been performed as early as 1957. The first static firing of a full-stage developmental F-1 was performed in March 1959. The first F-1 was delivered to NASA MSFC in October 1963. In December 1964, the F-1 completed flight rating tests. Testing continued at least through 1965.

Early development tests revealed serious combustion instability problems which sometimes caused catastrophic failure. Initially, progress on this problem was slow, as it was intermittent and unpredictable. Oscillations of 4 kHz with harmonics to 24 kHz were observed. Eventually, engineers developed a diagnostic technique of detonating small explosive charges (which they called "bombs") outside the combustion chamber, through a tangential tube (RDX, C-4 or black powder were used) while the engine was firing. This allowed them to determine exactly how the running chamber responded to variations in pressure, and to determine how to nullify these oscillations. The designers could then quickly experiment with different co-axial fuel-injector designs to obtain the one most resistant to instability. These problems were addressed from 1959 through 1961. Eventually, engine combustion was so stable, it would self-damp artificially induced instability within one-tenth of a second.

Design 

The F-1 engine is the most powerful single-nozzle liquid-fueled rocket engine ever flown. The M-1 rocket engine was designed to have more thrust, but it was only tested at the component level. The later developed RD-170 is much more stable, technically more advanced, produces more thrust, but is not of a single chamber design. The F-1 burned RP-1 (rocket grade kerosene) as the fuel and used liquid oxygen (LOX) as the oxidizer. A turbopump was used to inject fuel and oxygen into the combustion chamber. 

One notable challenge in the construction of the F-1 was regenerative cooling of the thrust chamber. Chemical engineer Dennis “Dan” Brevik was faced with the task of ensuring the preliminary combustion chamber tube bundle and manifold design produced by Al Bokstellar would run cool. In essence, Brevik’s job was to “make sure it doesn’t melt.” Through Brevik’s calculations of the hydrodynamic and thermodynamic characteristics of the F-1, he and his team were able to fix an issue known as ‘starvation’. This is when an imbalance of static pressure leads to 'hot spots' in the manifolds. The material used for the F-1 thrust chamber tube bundle, reinforcing bands and manifold was Inconel-X750, a refractory nickel based alloy capable of withstanding high temperatures. 

The heart of the engine was the thrust chamber, which mixed and burned the fuel and oxidizer to produce thrust. A domed chamber at the top of the engine served as a manifold supplying liquid oxygen to the injectors, and also served as a mount for the gimbal bearing which transmitted the thrust to the body of the rocket. Below this dome were the injectors, which directed fuel and oxidizer into the thrust chamber in a way designed to promote mixing and combustion.  Fuel was supplied to the injectors from a separate manifold; some of the fuel first traveled in 178 tubes down the length of the thrust chamber — which formed approximately the upper half of the exhaust nozzle — and back in order to cool the nozzle.

A gas generator was used to drive a turbine which drove separate fuel and oxygen pumps, each feeding the thrust chamber assembly. The turbine was driven at 5,500 RPM, producing . The fuel pump delivered  of RP-1 per minute while the oxidizer pump delivered  of liquid oxygen per minute. Structurally, fuel was used to lubricate and cool the turbine bearings.

Below the thrust chamber was the nozzle extension, roughly half the length of the engine. This extension increased the expansion ratio of the engine from 10:1 to 16:1.  The exhaust from the turbine was fed into the nozzle extension by a large, tapered manifold; this relatively cool gas formed a film which protected the nozzle extension from the hot exhaust gas.

Each F-1 engine had more thrust than three Space Shuttle Main Engines combined.

Pre and post ignition procedures
During static test firing, the kerosene-based RP-1 fuel left hydrocarbon deposits and vapors in the engine post test firing.  These had to be removed from the engine to avoid problems during engine handling and future firing, and the solvent trichloroethylene (TCE) was used to clean the engine's fuel system immediately before and after each test firing.  The cleaning procedure involved pumping TCE through the engine's fuel system and letting the solvent overflow for a period ranging from several seconds to 30–35 minutes, depending upon the engine and the severity of the deposits.  For some engines, the engine's gas generator and LOX dome were also flushed with TCE prior to test firing.  The F-1 rocket engine had its LOX dome, gas generator, and thrust chamber fuel jacket flushed with TCE during launch preparations.

Specifications 

Sources:

F-1 improvements 

F-1 thrust and efficiency were improved between Apollo 8 (SA-503) and Apollo 17 (SA-512), which was necessary to meet the increasing payload capacity demands of later Apollo missions. There were small performance variations between engines on a given mission, and variations in average thrust between missions. For Apollo 15, F-1 performance was:

Thrust (average, per engine, sea level liftoff): 
Burn time: 159 seconds
Specific impulse: 
Mixture ratio: 2.2674
S-IC total sea level liftoff thrust: 

Measuring and making comparisons of rocket engine thrust is more complicated than it may first appear.

F-1A after Apollo 

During the 1960s, Rocketdyne undertook uprating development of the F-1 resulting in the new engine specification F-1A.  While outwardly very similar to the F-1, the F-1A produced about 20% greater thrust,  in tests, and would have been used on future Saturn V vehicles in the post-Apollo era. However, the Saturn V production line was closed prior to the end of Project Apollo and no F-1A engines ever flew.

There were proposals to use eight F-1 engines on the first stage of the Saturn C-8 and Nova rockets. Numerous proposals have been made from the 1970s and on to develop new expendable boosters based around the F-1 engine design. These include the Saturn-Shuttle, and the Pyrios booster (see below) in 2013. , none have proceeded beyond the initial study phase. The Comet HLLV would have used five F-1A engines on the main core and two on each of the boosters.

The F-1 is the largest, highest-thrust single-chamber, single-nozzle liquid-fuel engine flown. Larger solid-fuel engines exist, such as the Space Shuttle Solid Rocket Booster with a sea-level liftoff thrust of  apiece.

F-1B booster

As part of the Space Launch System (SLS) program, NASA had been running the Advanced Booster Competition, which was scheduled to end with the selection of a winning booster configuration in 2015.  In 2013, engineers at the Marshall Space Flight Center began tests with an original F-1, serial number F-6049, which was removed from Apollo 11 due to a glitch. The engine was never used, and for many years it was at the Smithsonian Institution. The tests are designed to refamiliarize NASA with the design and propellants of the F-1 in anticipation of using an evolved version of the engine in future deep-space flight applications.

In 2012, Pratt & Whitney, Rocketdyne, and Dynetics, Inc. presented a competitor known as Pyrios, a liquid rocket booster, in NASA's Advanced Booster Program, which aims to find a more powerful successor to the five-segment Space Shuttle Solid Rocket Boosters intended for early versions of the Space Launch System. Pyrios uses two increased-thrust and heavily modified F-1B engines per booster. Due to the engine's potential advantage in specific impulse, if this F-1B configuration (using four F-1Bs in total) were integrated with the SLS Block 2, the vehicle could deliver  to low Earth orbit, while  is what is regarded as achievable with the planned solid boosters combined with a four-engine RS-25 core stage.

The F-1B engine has a design goal to be at least as powerful as the unflown F-1A, while also being more cost effective. The design incorporates a greatly simplified combustion chamber, a reduced number of engine parts, and the removal of the F-1 exhaust recycling system, including the turbine exhaust mid-nozzle and the "curtain" cooling manifold, with the turbine exhaust having a separate outlet passage beside the shortened main nozzle on the F-1B. The reduction in parts costs is aided by using selective laser melting in the production of some metallic parts. The resulting F-1B engine is intended to produce  of thrust at sea level, a 15% increase over the approximate  of thrust that the mature Apollo 15 F-1 engines produced.

Locations of F-1 engines

Sixty-five F-1 engines were launched aboard thirteen Saturn Vs, and each first stage landed in the Atlantic Ocean. Ten of these followed approximately the same flight azimuth of 72 degrees, but Apollo 15 and Apollo 17 followed significantly more southerly azimuths (80.088 degrees and  91.503 degrees, respectively). The Skylab launch vehicle flew at a more northerly azimuth to reach a higher inclination orbit (50 degrees versus the usual 32.5 degrees).

Ten F-1 engines were installed on two production Saturn Vs that never flew. The first stage from SA-514 is on display at the Johnson Space Center in Houston (although owned by the Smithsonian) and the first stage from SA-515 is on display at the INFINITY Science Center at John C. Stennis Space Center in Mississippi.

Another ten engines were installed on two ground test Saturn Vs never intended to fly. The S-IC-T "All Systems Test Stage," a ground-test replica, is on display as the first stage of a complete Saturn V at the Kennedy Space Center in Florida. SA-500D, the Dynamic Test Vehicle, is on display at the U.S. Space and Rocket Center in Huntsville, Alabama.

A test engine is on display at the Powerhouse Museum in Sydney, Australia. It was the 25th out of 114 research and development engines built by Rocketdyne and it was fired 35 times. The engine is on loan to the museum from the Smithsonian's National Air and Space Museum. It is the only F-1 on display outside the United States.

An F-1 engine, on loan from the National Air and Space Museum, is on display at the Air Zoo in Portage, Michigan.

An F-1 engine is on a horizontal display stand at Science Museum Oklahoma in Oklahoma City.

F-1 engine F-6049 is displayed vertically at the Museum of Flight in Seattle, Washington as part of the Apollo exhibit.

An F-1 engine is installed vertically as a memorial to the Rocketdyne builders on De Soto across the street from the old Rocketdyne plant in Canoga Park, California.  It was installed in 1979, and moved from the parking lot across the street some time after 1980. East side of De Soto Ave. and Osborne St., on De Soto

F-1 Engine on display outside of The New Mexico Museum of Space History in Alamogordo, New Mexico.

The thrust chamber of an F-1 is on display at the Cosmosphere.

Recovery

On March 28, 2012, a team funded by Jeff Bezos, founder of Amazon.com, reported that they had located the F-1 rocket engines from an Apollo mission using sonar equipment. However, the condition of the engines, which have been submerged for more than 40 years, was unknown. NASA Administrator Charles Bolden released a statement congratulating Bezos and his team for their find and wished them success. He also affirmed NASA's position that any recovered artifacts would remain property of the agency, but that they would likely be offered to the Smithsonian Institution and other museums, depending on the number recovered.

On March 20, 2013, Bezos announced he had succeeded in bringing parts of an F-1 engine to the surface, and released photographs. Bezos noted, "Many of the original serial numbers are missing or partially missing, which is going to make mission identification difficult. We might see more during restoration."  The recovery ship was Seabed Worker, and had on board a team of specialists organized by Bezos for the recovery effort. On July 19, 2013, Bezos revealed that the serial number of one of the recovered engines is Rocketdyne serial number 2044 (equating to NASA number 6044), the #5 (center) engine that helped Neil Armstrong, Buzz Aldrin, and Michael Collins to reach the Moon with the Apollo 11 mission.   The recovered parts were brought to the Kansas Cosmosphere and Space Center in Hutchinson for the process of conservation.

In August 2014, it was revealed that parts of two different F-1 engines were recovered, one from Apollo 11 and one from another Apollo flight, while a photograph of a cleaned-up engine was released.  Bezos plans to put the engines on display at various places, including the National Air and Space Museum in Washington, D.C.

On May 20, 2017 the Apollo permanent exhibit opened at the Museum of Flight in Seattle, WA and displays engine artifacts recovered including the thrust chamber and thrust chamber injector of the number 3 engine from the Apollo 12 mission, as well as a gas generator from an engine that powered the Apollo 16 flight.

See also 
 Comparison of orbital rocket engines

References 
Notes

Bibliography
 Apollo 15 Press Kit
 Saturn V Launch Vehicle, Flight Evaluation Report, AS-510, MPR-SAT-FE-71-2, October 28, 1971.

Manuals
 Technical Manual R-3896-1: Engine Data F-1 Rocket Engine
 Technical Manual R-3896-3 Volume I: Maintenance and Repair F-1 Rocket Engine
 Technical Manual R-3896-3 Volume II: Maintenance and Repair F-1 Rocket Engine
 Technical Manual R-3896-4: Illustrated Parts Breakdown F-1 Rocket Engine
 Technical Manual R-3896-5 Volume I: Ground Support Equipment and Repair F-1 Rocket Engine
 Technical Manual R-3896-5 Volume II: Ground Support Equipment Maintenance and Repair F-1 Rocket Engine
 Technical Manual R-3896-6: Installation and Repair of Thermal Insulation F-1 Rocket Engine
 Technical Manual R-3896-9: Transportation F-1 Rocket Engine
 Technical Manual R-3896-11: F-1 Rocket Engine Operating Instructions

External links 

 E-1 at the Encyclopedia Astronautica
 F-1 at the Encyclopedia Astronautica
 F-1A at the Encyclopedia Astronautica
 NASA SP-4206 Stages to Saturn - the official NASA history of the Saturn launch vehicle
 F-1 Engine Operating  Instructions (310MB)
 The Saturn V F-1 Engine: Powering Apollo into History at Springer.com
 Remembering The Giants: Apollo Rocket Propulsion Development, 2009, John C. Stennis Space Center. Monograph in Aerospace History No. 45 NASA
 How NASA brought the monstrous F-1 “moon rocket” engine back to life
 New F-1B rocket engine upgrades Apollo-era design with 1.8M lbs of thrust
  MSFC History office F-1 Fact sheet
 Anthony Young Collection, The University of Alabama in Huntsville Archives and Special Collections Research material on the development of the F-1 engine.

Rocket engines using kerosene propellant
Rocketdyne engines
North American Aviation
Rocket engines using the gas-generator cycle
Rocket engines of the United States